Lakeview High School (LHS) is a public high school in Lakeview, Oregon, United States.

Lakeview, along with Paisley School, takes high students from Adel and Plush.

Academics
In 2008, 91% of the school's favorite received a high school diploma. Of 79 students, 72 graduated and seven dropped out.

Athletics 
Lakeview's high school athletic program began around the time the school did.  The mascot is known as the "Honker" and the team colors are navy blue and gold. A "Honker" is another name for a Canada goose.

They are a member in good standing of the Oregon School Activities Association and participate in the Southern Cascade League.  All teams currently play in Class 2A based on school enrollment.

See also
 Bernard Daly Educational Fund

References

High schools in Lake County, Oregon
Buildings and structures in Lakeview, Oregon
Public high schools in Oregon